HD 99922 is a double star system in the constellation of Crater. It shines with an apparent visual magnitude of 5.77 from a distance of about 450 light years (140 parsecs) away from the Earth. The primary star is an A-type main sequence star; the secondary star is located about 8 arcseconds away.

Other designations include HR 4428 and HIP 56078.

References

Crater (constellation)
056078
099922
4428
Durchmusterung objects
Double stars
A-type main-sequence stars